Charles R. Eisendrath (born October 9, 1940, in Chicago, Illinois) is an American journalist, professor and inventor.

He is most notable for being the director of the Knight-Wallace Fellowships at the University of Michigan, and credited with turning it into one of American journalism's most prestigious university programs. He is a long-time Time  correspondent. He is also notable for his invention of a wood-burning grill called Grillworks.

Eisendrath is also an on-air contributor to C-SPAN television.

He received national attention in 1973 when he was the onsite reporter for Time in Santiago during the coup that overthrew the Marxist government of Salvador Allende, and securing the first ever post-coup interview with new dictator Augusto Pinochet.

Career 
After graduating in history at Yale, Eisendrath became a journalist, and reported for the St. Louis Post-Dispatch and Baltimore Evening Sun. Eisendrath then joined Time as a correspondent in Washington, London and Paris, eventually becoming bureau chief in Buenos Aires where he was responsible for all news operations in Hispanic South America.

His work has appeared on NPR and in The New York Times, The Wall Street Journal, the International Herald Tribune and The Atlantic. He has been a guest on ABC's Good Morning America and a commentator on National Public Radio's Morning Edition.

From 1975 to 2016 he was a professor at the University of Michigan where he founded Wallace House, which includes the Knight-Wallace Journalism Fellowships, one of the nation's leading mid-career professional journalism programs, and The Livingston Awards, widely known as "the Pulitzer Prize for the Young", raising $60 million endowment to permanently sustain the fellowships, and was founding director of the prizes.

Personal 
He and his wife, Julia, live in Ann Arbor and East Jordan, Michigan, have two sons, Benjamin Cardozo E and Mark William E, and three grandsons.

Honors 
 Chairman of the Development Committee of the Center for Public Integrity
 Elected to the Council on Foreign Relations
 Pulitzer Prize International Jury 
 Chairman of the American Board of the International Press Institute
 Michigan Journalism Hall of Fame
 Selected for Who's Who in America 1996
 Richard M. Clurman Award for Distinguished Mentoring in Journalism
 Tom Brokaw said "Charles Eisendrath has long been considered a reporter's reporter"

References
.

External links
Grillworks LLC

Living people
The Baltimore Sun people
Yale College alumni
Journalists from Michigan
St. Louis Post-Dispatch people
University of Michigan faculty
20th-century American male writers
20th-century American journalists
American male journalists
Writers from Chicago
Journalists from Illinois
1940 births